The 11th Supreme People's Assembly (Chosongul: 최고인민회의 제11기) of North Korea was in session from 2003 until 2009. It consisted of 687 deputies, and held six sessions.

The Supreme People's Assembly is the unicameral legislature of the Democratic People's Republic of Korea (DPRK), commonly known as North Korea. It consists of one deputy from each of the DPRK's 687 constituencies, elected to five-year terms. The constitution recognizes the Workers' Party as the leading party of the state. The Workers' Party, led by Kim Jong-un, governs the DPRK in a monopoly coalition with the Social Democratic Party and the Chondoist Chongu Party called the Democratic Front for the Reunification of the Fatherland. Elections are held in five-year intervals, the most recent taking place in 2019. Although the Supreme People's Assembly is the primary legislative body of the DPRK, it ordinarily delegates authority to the smaller and more powerful Presidium, chosen from among its members.

Leadership
President of the Presidium of the Supreme People's Assembly
Kim Yong-nam
Vice Presidents of the Presidium of the Supreme People's Assembly
Yang Hyong-sop
Kim Yong-dae
Honorable Vice Presidents of the Presidium of the Supreme People's Assembly
Pak Song-chol
Kim Yong-ju
Secretary General of the Presidium of the Supreme People's Assembly
Kim Yun-hyok
Members of the Presidium of the Supreme People's Assembly
Ryu Mi-yong
Kang Yong-sop
Pak Tae-hwa
Hong Sok-hyong
Ri Kwang-ho
Ryom Sun-gil
Sung Sang-sop
Pak Sun-hui
Pyon Yong-rip
Thae Yong-chol
Chairman of the Supreme People's Assembly
Choe Thae-bok
Vice Chairmen of the Supreme People's Assembly
Kang Nung-so
Ryo Won-gu

Sessions

1st session 
Date: 3 September 2003

Highlights:

 The SPA chairman and vice-chairmen were elected.
 The Credentials Committee was elected with Jon Pyong-ho as its chairman.
 Kim Jong-il was re-elected as Chairman of the National Defense Commission.
 The SPA Presidium was elected.
 The National Defence Commission was elected.
 First Vice Chairman: Jo Myong-rok
 Vice Chairmen: Yon Hyong-muk, Ri Yong-mu
 Members: Kim Yong-chun, Kim Il-chol, Jon Pyong-ho, Choe Ryong-su, Paek Se-bong
 The Premier and the Cabinet were elected.
 Premier: Pak Pong-ju
 Vice Premiers: Kwak Pom-gi, Ro Tu-chol, Jon Sung-hun
 Minister of Foreign Affairs: Paek Nam-sun
 Minister of Public Security: Choe Ryong-su
 Chairman of the State Planning Commission: Kim Kwang-rin
 Minister of Power and Coal Industries: Ju Tong-il
 Minister of Extractive Industries: Ri Kwang-nam
 Minister of Metal and Machine Building Industries: Kim Sung-hyon
 Minister of Electronics Industry: O Su-yong
 Minister of Construction and Building Materials Industries: Jo Yun-hui
 Minister of Railways: Kim Yong-sam
 Minister of Land and Marine Transport: Kim Yong-il
 Minister of Agriculture: Ri Kyong-sik
 Minister of Chemical Industry: Ri Mu-yong
 Minister of Light Industry: Ri Ju-o
 Minister of Foreign Trade: Ri Kwang-gun
 Minister of Forestry: Ri Sang-mu
 Minister of Fisheries: Ri Song-ung
 Minister of City Management: Choe Jong-gon
 Minister of Land and Environment Preservation: Jang Il-son
 Minister of State Construction Control: Pae Tal-jun
 Minister of Commerce: Ri Yong-son
 Minister of Procurement and Food Administration: Choe Nam-gyun
 Minister of Education: Kim Yong-jin
 Minister of Posts and Telecommunications: Ri Kum-bom
 Minister of Culture: Choe Ik-gyu
 Minister of Finance: Mun Il-bong
 Minister of Labor: Ri Won-il
 Minister of Public Health: Kim Su-hak
 Minister of Physical Culture and Sports: Pak Myong-chol
 Minister of State Inspection: Kim Ui-sun
 President of the Academy of Sciences: Pyon Yong-rip
 Chairman of the Physical Culture and Sports Guidance Commission: Pak Myong-chol
 President of the Central Bank: Kim Wan-su
 Director of the Central Statistic Bureau: Kim Chang-su
 Chief Secretary: Jong Mun-san
 The SPA committees were elected.
 Legislation Committee
 Chairman: Choe Ryong-su
 Budget Committee
 Chairman: Han Song-ryong
 The Public Prosecutor-General of the Central Public Prosecutors' Office and the President of the Central Court were elected.
 Public Prosecutor-General of the Supreme Prosecutors' Office: Ri Kil-song
 Chief Justice of the Supreme Court: Kim Pyong-ryul
 The measures of the Ministry of Foreign Affairs in relation to the DPRK-US nuclear issue were approved.
 Jon Pyong-ho made a report on the credentials of the SPA deputies.
 Jon Pyong-ho's report on the credentials of the SPA deputies was approved.

2nd session 
Date:  25 March 2004

Highlights:

 Premier Pak Pong-ju made a report on the work of the Cabinet in 2003 and its tasks in 2004.
 Finance minister Mun Il-bong made a report on the implementation of the 2003 state budget and on the 2004 state budget.
 Pak Pong-ju's report on the work of the Cabinet and Mun Il-bong's report on the implementation of the 2003 state budget were approved.
 The 2004 state budget was adopted.

3rd session 
Date: 11 April 2005

Highlights:

 Premier Pak Pong-ju made a report on the work of the Cabinet in 2004 and its tasks in 2005.
 Finance minister Mun Il-bong made a report on the implementation of the 2004 state budget and on the 2005 state budget.
 Pak Pong-ju's report on the work of the Cabinet and Mun Il-bong's report on the implementation of the 2004 state budget were approved.
 The 2005 state budget was adopted.
 Choe Yong-rim was elected as secretary general of the SPA presidium.
 Kang Chang-uk was elected as a member of the SPA presidium.

4th session 
Date: 11 April 2006

Highlights:

 Premier Pak Pong-ju made a report on the work of the Cabinet in 2005 and its tasks in 2006.
 Vice premier Ro Tu-chol made a report on the implementation of the 2005 state budget and on the 2006 state budget.
 Pak Pong-ju's report on the work of the Cabinet and Ro Tu-chol's report on the implementation of the 2005 state budget were approved.
 The 2006 state budget was adopted.
 SPA chairman Choe Thae-bok made a report on improving the development of science and technology.
 A decision on improving the development of science and technology was adopted.

5th session 
Date: 11 April 2007

Highlights:

 Vice premier Kwak Pom-gi made a report on the work of the Cabinet in 2006 and its tasks in 2007.
 Vice premier Ro Tu-chol made a report on the implementation of the 2006 state budget and on the 2007 state budget.
 The 2007 state budget was adopted.
 Kim Yong-il was elected as Premier replacing Pak Pong-ju.
 Kim Yong-chun was elected as NDC vice chairman.

6th session 
Date: 9 April 2008

Highlights:

 Premier Kim Yong-il made a report on the work of the Cabinet in 2007 and its tasks in 2008.
 Vice premier Ro Tu-chol made a report on the implementation of the 2007 state budget and on the 2008 state budget.
 The 2008 state budget was adopted.
 SPA vice chairman Kang Nung-so was recalled.

References

11th Supreme People's Assembly
2003 establishments in North Korea
2009 disestablishments in North Korea